is a prefecture of Japan located on the island of Kyūshū. Nagasaki Prefecture has a population of 1,314,078 (1 June 2020) and has a geographic area of 4,130 km2 (1,594 sq mi). Nagasaki Prefecture borders Saga Prefecture to the northeast.

Nagasaki is the capital and largest city of Nagasaki Prefecture, with other major cities including Sasebo, Isahaya, and Ōmura. Nagasaki Prefecture is located in western Kyūshū with a territory consisting of many mainland peninsulas centered around Ōmura Bay, as well as islands and archipelagos including Tsushima and Iki in the Korea Strait and the Gotō Islands in the East China Sea. Nagasaki Prefecture is known for its century-long trading history with the Europeans and as the sole place of direct trade and exchange between Japan and the outside world during the Sakoku period. Nagasaki Prefecture is home to several of the Hidden Christian Sites in the Nagasaki Region which have been declared a UNESCO World Heritage Site.

History 

Nagasaki Prefecture was created by merging of the western half of the former province of Hizen with the island provinces of Tsushima and Iki. Facing China and Korea, the region around Hirado was a traditional center for traders and pirates.

During the 16th century, Catholic missionaries and traders from Portugal arrived and became active in Hirado and Nagasaki, which became a major center for foreign trade. After being given free rein in Oda Nobunaga's period, the missionaries were forced out little by little, until finally, in the Tokugawa era, Christianity was banned under the Sakoku national isolation policy: Japanese foreign trade was restricted to Chinese and Dutch traders based at Dejima in Nagasaki. However, Kirishitan (Japanese Christian) worship continued underground. These Kakure Kirishitan (hidden Christians) were tried at every step, forced to step on fumi-e ("trample pictures", images of the Virgin Mary and saints) to prove that they were non-Christian. With the banishment of all Catholic missionaries, traders from Catholic countries were also forced out of the country. Along with them, their children, half Japanese and half European, were forced to leave. The majority was sent to Jagatara (Jakarta) and are still remembered by the locals as the people who wrote the poignant letters which were smuggled across the sea to their homeland.

Today, Nagasaki has prominent Catholic churches, and the Hidden Christian Sites in the Nagasaki Region, have been included on the UNESCO World Heritage List.

During the Meiji Restoration, Nagasaki and Sasebo became major ports for foreign trade, and eventually major military bases and shipbuilding centers for the Imperial Japanese Navy and the Mitsubishi Heavy Industries up to World War II. On August 9, 1945, the United States dropped an atomic bomb on Nagasaki, which destroyed all buildings in a  radius from the point of impact and extensively damaged other parts of the city. Roughly 39,000 people were killed, including 27,778 Japanese munitions workers, 2,000 Korean forced workers, and 150 Japanese soldiers. About 68-80% of the industrial production was destroyed to the point it would not recover for months or at least a year.

Nagasaki Prefecture contains many areas prone to heavy rain and landslide damage. In July 1957, mainly in the Isahaya area, damage from heavy rains, flooding and landslides lead to a death toll of 586, with 136 people missing and 3,860 injured. In July 1982, typhoon damage in the Nagasaki area lead to 299 fatalities, according to a report by the Japanese government.

Geography 
Nagasaki borders Saga Prefecture on the east, and is otherwise surrounded by water, including Ariake Bay, the Tsushima Straits (far from Busan and South Gyeongsang Province, South Korea), and the East China Sea. It also includes a large number of islands such as Tsushima, Iki and Goto. Most of the prefecture is near the coast and there are a number of ports such as Nagasaki and a United States Navy base at Sasebo.

As of 1 April 2014, 18% of the total land area of the prefecture was designated as Natural Parks, namely the Saikai and Unzen-Amakusa National Parks; Genkai and Iki-Tsushima Quasi-National Parks; and Hokushō, Nishi Sonogi Hantō, Nomo Hantō, Ōmurawan, Shimabara Hantō, and Taradake Prefectural Natural Parks.

Cities

 

Thirteen cities are located in Nagasaki Prefecture:

Districts
These are the towns and villages of each district:

Mergers 

The following municipalities have been dissolved since the year 2000.

Kitamatsuura District:
Emukae, Fukushima, Ikitsuki, Kosaza, Ōshima, Sechibaru, Shikamachi, Tabira, Takashima, Uku, Yoshii
Minamimatsuura District:
Arikawa, Kamigotō, Kishiku, Miiraku, Narao, Naru, Shin'uonome, Tamanoura, Tomie, Wakamatsu
Nishisonogi District:
Iōjima, Kinkai, Kōyagi, Nomozaki, Ōseto, Ōshima, Saikai, Sakito, Sanwa, Seihi, Sotome, Takashima, Tarami
Kitatakaki District:
Iimori, Konagai, Moriyama, Takaki
Minamitakaki District:
Aino, Ariake, Arie, Azuma, Chidiwa, Fukae, Futsu, Kazusa, Kitaarima, Kuchinotsu, Kunimi, Minamiarima, Minamikushiyama, Mizuho, Nishiarie, Obama
Kamiagata District:
Kamiagata, Kamitsushima, Mine
Shimoagata District:
Izuhara, Mitsushima, Toyotama
Iki District:
Ashibe, Gonoura, Ishida, Katsumoto

Culture

Religion

Nagasaki is the most Christianized area in Japan with Roman Catholic missions having been established there as early as the 16th century. Shusaku Endo's novel Silence draws from the oral history of the local Christian (Kirishitan) communities, both Kakure Kirishitan and Hanare Kirishitan.

As of 2002, there are 68,617 Catholics in Nagasaki Prefecture, accounting for 4.52 percent of the population of the prefecture.

Sports

The city has one football team, V-Varen Nagasaki, which plays in the J2 League.

The Nagasaki Saints of the former Shikoku-Kyūshū Island League made Nagasaki Prefecture their home prior to their dissolving.

Visitor attractions

Nagasaki (capital city)
 Ōura Church
 Urakami Cathedral
 Confucius Shrine, Nagasaki
 Glover Garden
 Nagasaki Shinchi Chinatown
 Mount Inasa
 Kōfuku-ji
 Sōfuku-ji
 Suwa Shrine
Hirado
 Hirado Castle
 Sakikata Park
Sasebo
 Kujū-ku Islands
 Huis Ten Bosch (theme park)
 Tenkaihō
Saikai
 Nagasaki Bio Park
Shimabara Peninsula
 Mount Unzen
 Shimabara Castle

Transportation

Rail
JR Kyushu
Nagasaki Main Line
Sasebo Line
Omura Line
Shimabara Railway
Matsuura Railway
Nishi-Kyūshū Line

Tram
Nagasaki Electric Tramway

Roads

Expressways and toll roads
Nagasaki Expressway
West Kyushu Expressway
Nagasaki Dejima Road
Kawahira Toll Road
Kunimi Toll Road
Kawahira Toll Road

National highways
 Route 34
 Route 35
 Route 57
 Route 202
 Route 204
 Route 205
 Route 206
 Route 207
 Route 251
 Route 324
 Route 382
 Route 383
 Route 384
 Route 389
 Route 444
 Route 498
 Route 499

Ports
Nagasaki Port
Sasebo Port
Matsuura Port
Hirado Port
Shimabara Port
Fukue Port
Izuhara Port of Tsushima
Gonoura Port of Iki Island

Airports
Nagasaki Airport
Fukue Airport
Iki Airport
Tsushima Airport

Politics

The current governor of Nagasaki is Kengo Oishi, who defeated 3-term incumbent Hōdō Nakamura in 2022. Oishi, a doctor, was 39-year old when he took office, and the youngest sitting prefectural governor in Japan. Nakamura was first elected in 2010 to succeed Genjirō Kaneko and was previously a vice-governor.

The prefectural assembly of Nagasaki has a regular membership of 46, elected in 16 electoral districts in unified regional elections (last round: 2011). As of April 2014, the LDP-led caucus has 23 members, the DPJ-SDP-led caucus 17.

In the National Diet, Nagasaki is represented by four directly elected members of the House of Representatives and two (one per ordinary election) of the House of Councillors. After the most recent national elections of 2010, 2012 and 2013, Nagasaki sends an all-LDP delegation to the Diet (excluding members who lost election in Nagasaki districts, but were elected to the proportional representation segment of the House of Representatives in the Kyūshū block).

Citations

General references 
 Nussbaum, Louis-Frédéric and Käthe Roth (2005). Japan Encyclopedia. Cambridge: Harvard University Press. ;

External links 

 
 

 
Kyushu region
Prefectures of Japan